Jānis Birks (born 31 July 1956 in Riga) is a Latvian politician. He was the Mayor of Riga between 19 February 2007 and 1 July 2009.

References

For Fatherland and Freedom/LNNK politicians
1956 births
Living people
Mayors of Riga
Politicians from Riga
Riga Stradiņš University alumni
Recipients of the Order of Prince Yaroslav the Wise, 4th class